Rajitha Wickramarachchi (born 21 December 1987) is a Sri Lankan cricketer. He made his first-class debut for Saracens Sports Club in the 2008–09 Premier Trophy on 14 November 2008. He made his Twenty20 debut on 12 January 2020, for Kandy Customs Cricket Club in the 2019–20 SLC Twenty20 Tournament.

References

External links
 

1987 births
Living people
Sri Lankan cricketers
Kandy Youth Cricket Club cricketers
Moors Sports Club cricketers
Saracens Sports Club cricketers
Sportspeople from Kandy